The Hong Kong Watch & Clock Fair is a timepiece trade show held annually in Hong Kong. It is organised by the Hong Kong Trade Development Council (HKTDC), Hong Kong Watch Manufacturers Association Ltd., and The Federation of Hong Kong Watch Trades and Industries Ltd. The fair showcases both Hong Kong and international labels, and  also serves a platform for participants to exchange information and market intelligence. The five-day-long trade fair is opened every year in the beginning of September at the Hong Kong Convention and Exhibition Centre.

Special highlights of the fair include Brand Name Gallery, an attractive setting for fashionable timepieces by top brands, and Pageant of Eternity, designed to highlight the beauty and craftsmanship of watches at the high end of the spectrum. 

The fair was established in 1982.

Exhibit categories
	Brand Name Gallery (Brand Name Watches & Clocks)
	Complete Watches & Clocks
	Part & Components
	Machinery/ Equipment
	Packaging
Trade Services

See also
Baselworld
Watches & Wonders

References

External links

Trade fairs in Hong Kong
Horological organizations
1982 establishments in Hong Kong
Recurring events established in 1982
Annual events in Hong Kong